Blšany is a town in Louny District in the Ústí nad Labem Region of the Czech Republic. It has about 1,000 inhabitants.

Administrative parts
Villages of Liběšovice, Malá Černoc, Siřem, Soběchleby and Stachov are administrative parts of Blšany.

Geography
The northern part of the municipal territory lies in the Most Basin. The Blšanka River flows through the town.

History
The first written mention of Blšany is from 1238, when the village was a property of the Waldsassen Abbey. Between 1238 and 1252, a small town was founded on the site of the village.

From 1938 to 1945 it was annexed by Nazi Germany and administered as part of the Reichsgau Sudetenland.

Sport
Blšany is known nationwide for its football club FK Chmel Blšany, which played in the Czech First League between 1998 and 2006.

Notable people
Franz Kafka spent several months in convalescence in the village of Siřem after tuberculosis was diagnosed.

References

External links

Cities and towns in the Czech Republic
Populated places in Louny District